The 2016 Firenasjonersturneringer (translated from the Norwegian Four Nations Tournament) was a friendly women's handball tournament organized by the Norwegian Handball Federation held at the city of Langhus as a preparation of the host nation for the Olympic Games.

Results

Round robin

Final standing

References

External links
Tournament Statistics on Norwegian Federation Official Website

Firenasjonersturneringer
2016 in Norwegian sport
International handball competitions hosted by Norway
Women's handball competitions